Kolyo Stanev (born 10 October 2001) is a Bulgarian footballer who plays for Etar Veliko Tarnovo as a defender.

Career
On 20 September 2017, Stanev made his professional debut at 15 years old as an 83rd-minute substitute for Erik Pochanski in a 4–2 Bulgarian Cup win over Pomorie at Lazur Stadium. He made his First League debut as a substitute for Ventsislav Vasilev in the 2–0 win over Septemvri Sofia at Vasil Levski National Stadium on 1 September 2018.

Club statistics

Club

References

External links
 
 

2001 births
Living people
Bulgarian footballers
Bulgaria youth international footballers
First Professional Football League (Bulgaria) players
SFC Etar Veliko Tarnovo players
Association football defenders
People from Veliko Tarnovo
Sportspeople from Veliko Tarnovo Province